The 1980 ECAC South men's basketball tournament (now known as the Colonial Athletic Association men's basketball tournament) was held February 28–  March 1, 1980, at the Hampton Coliseum in Hampton, Virginia. It was the first edition of the tournament. 

 defeated  in the championship game, 62–51, to win their first ECAC South men's basketball tournament. The Monarchs, therefore, earned an automatic bid to the 1980 NCAA tournament; this was ODU's first-ever bid to the Division I NCAA tournament.

Bracket

References

Colonial Athletic Association men's basketball tournament
Tournament
ECAC South men's basketball tournament
ECAC South men's basketball tournament
ECAC South men's basketball tournament
College basketball tournaments in Virginia
Sports in Hampton, Virginia